Manipal Academy of Higher Education has produced many alumni from engineering to science to literature.

Business
Rajeev Suri, CEO of Nokia
Satya Nadella, CEO of Microsoft
M. G. George Muthoot, billionaire businessman and chairman of The Muthoot Group.
Pankaj Oswal, billionaire, chairman and sole founder of Burrup Holdings Limited.
Anant J Talaulicar, president and CEO, Cummins India Ltd.

Others
Rajeev Chandrasekhar, Indian politician and multimillionaire entrepreneur who is currently serving as Union Minister of State & Member of Parliament in the upper house (Rajya Sabha) of the Indian Parliament.
Devi Shetty, Indian billionaire entrepreneur and cardiac surgeon 
Shamsheer Vayalil, an Indian radiologist and billionaire businessman. He is the founder, chairman and managing director of VPS Healthcare Group and the vice chairman and managing director of Amanat Holdings, a healthcare and education investment company.
M. G. George Muthoot, billionaire businessman and chairman of The Muthoot Group.
Pankaj Oswal, billionaire, chairman and sole founder of Burrup Holdings Limited.
Vinod K Jose:, Journalist and Editor of The Caravan.
Mirza Faizan, Indian aerospace scientist who developed the Ground Reality Information Processing System (GRIPS).
Arun Shenoy, Grammy Award-nominated musician
Nag Ashwin, an Indian film director.
Vikas Khanna, Michelin Guide Star Chef
Annapoorna Kini, American cardiologist and a professor of Cardiology at Mount Sinai School of Medicine in New York City.
Sheikh Muszaphar Shukor, Malaysian orthopedic surgeon and the first Malaysian astronaut.
Esha Gupta, Bollywood actor and model.
Disha Oberoi, popularly known as R J Disha, is a Radio Jockey from Bangalore, India.
Nithya Menen, Indian actress.

References